Riley Lake may refer to:

 Riley Lake (Kenora District), Northwestern Ontario, Canada
 Riley Lake (Muskoka), Central Ontario, Canada